Silvina Reinaudi (born 12 March 1942) is an Argentine children's literature writer and puppeteer, best known for her numerous plays with puppets presented in Argentina and Spain.

Early life
Silvina Reinaudi was born and raised in Río Cuarto, but in 1982 she moved to Buenos Aires, where she currently resides. She studied law and literature, but did not take to either of these, rather devoting her whole life to making puppets, creating shows, and composing plays for children. She has two daughters, Martina and Luciana Miravalles.

Career
With her company Reinaudi created several characters that she would later include in her published stories, such as the little dog Rito, Marimonia, and Sonio. These last two characters appeared on the program Cablín con Marimonia y Sonio, broadcast by the now-defunct children's cable channel .

She works at the children's magazine Billiken, where she is in charge of the Billy supplement, designed for young children.

Selected plays
 Sietevidas (1993)
 Huevito de ida y vuelta, with Sergio Blostein (1995)
 Cuentos con yapa (1998)
 Cuentos con la almohada (1998)
 Sietevidas. El regreso del gato (2001)

Awards
 ACE Award for Children's Theater (2001)
 Konex Award Merit Diploma for Children's and Young Adult Entertainment (2001)
 María Guerrero Career Award (2003)
 ATINA Career Award (2010)
 ATINA Award for Dramaturgy (2015)

References

1942 births
20th-century Argentine women writers
20th-century Argentine writers
21st-century Argentine short story writers
Argentine children's writers
Argentine women novelists
Argentine women short story writers
Living people
People from Río Cuarto, Córdoba
Puppeteers
Argentine women children's writers
21st-century Argentine women writers
21st-century Argentine writers